Inguinal lymph nodes are lymph nodes in the human groin. Located in the femoral triangle of the inguinal region, they are grouped into superficial and deep lymph nodes. The superficial have three divisions: the superomedial, superolateral, and inferior superficial.

Superficial inguinal lymph nodes
 The superficial inguinal lymph nodes are the inguinal lymph nodes that form a chain immediately below the inguinal ligament. They lie deep to the fascia of Camper that overlies the femoral vessels at the medial aspect of the thigh. They are bounded superiorly by the inguinal ligament in the femoral triangle; laterally by the border of the sartorius muscle, and medially by the adductor longus muscle.

They are divided into three groups:
 inferior – inferior of the saphenous opening of the leg, receive drainage from lower legs 
 superolateral – on the side of the saphenous opening, receive drainage from the side buttocks and the lower abdominal wall. 
 superomedial – located at the middle of the saphenous opening, take drainage from the perineum and genitals.

There are approximately ten superficial lymph nodes, and they drain to the deep inguinal lymph nodes. Inguinal lymph nodes may normally be up to 2 cm in size.

They receive lymphatic afferents from the following:
 integument of the penis
 scrotum
 perineum
 buttock
 abdominal wall below the level of the umbilicus
 back below the level of the iliac crest
 vulva
 anus (below the pectinate line)
 the thigh and the medial side of the leg (the lateral leg drains to the popliteal lymph nodes first).

Deep inguinal lymph nodes
There can be three, four or five deep inguinal lymph nodes. They lie medial to the femoral vein under the cribriform fascia. The uppermost node is in the groin, under the inguinal ligament, and is called Cloquet's node (also Rosenmuller's node). This node is named for French surgeon Jules Germain Cloquet, or for German anatomist Johann Christian Rosenmüller. It can also be considered as the lowest of the external iliac lymph nodes. Cloquet's node is also considered as a potential sentinel lymph node.

The deep inguinal lymph nodes drain superiorly to the external iliac lymph nodes, then to the pelvic lymph nodes and on to the paraaortic lymph nodes.

Lymph node size
The mean size of an inguinal lymph node, as measured over the short-axis, is approximately 5.4 mm (range 2.1-13.6 mm), with two standard deviations above the mean being 8.8 mm. A size of up to 10 mm is generally regarded as a cut-off value for normal vs abnormal inguinal lymph node size.

Clinical significance
The presence of swollen inguinal lymph nodes is an important clinical sign because lymphadenopathy (swelling) may indicate an infection, or spread as a metastasis from cancers, such as anal cancer and vulvar cancer. Inguinal lymph nodes may normally be up to 2 cm. The cut-off value for normal sized inguinal nodes is up to 10 mm.

Additional images

References

Lymphatic organ anatomy